Parque de Campismo das Cinco Ribeiras is a park in the Azores. It is located in Angra do Heroísmo, on the island of Terceira.

Angra do Heroísmo
Campsites in Portugal